Lumber River State Park is a North Carolina state park along the Lumber River in Scotland, Hoke, Robeson and Columbus counties. It covers  along a 115-mile (185-km) stretch of the Lumber River. Lumber River State Park is located in North Carolina's Coastal Plain. It was established in 1989 as both a state park and designated as a "Natural and Scenic River" by the North Carolina General Assembly. In addition, it is the only blackwater river in North Carolina to be designated as a National Wild and Scenic River by the Department of the Interior.

Lumber River State Park encompasses parts of four counties along the Lumber River. The headwaters of the river are in Scotland County. The Lumber River bisects Robeson County. The recreational facilities are at the Princess Ann Landing in southeastern Robeson County near the towns of Orrum and Fair Bluff.

History
The Lumber River is the only blackwater river in North Carolina to be designated as a National Wild and Scenic River by the United States (US) Department of the Interior. The river flows freely along its entire course, making it one of the longest unobstructed rivers in North Carolina.

The upper section of the river was designated as a State Recreational Water Trail in 1978. The river was established as a National Canoe Trail in 1981. The lower Lumber River was designated as a State Canoe Trail in 1984. The General Assembly established the Lumber River as a Natural and Scenic River and also as a state park in 1989.

The first European settlements were made by Scots-Irish who migrated to the area in the late 18th century.  They chartered Princess Ann in 1796. The town was the second to be established in Robeson County, and the first settled by people ascending the river from South Carolina. Princess Ann has since been abandoned.  The name survives in local folklore and as the name of the road that leads to the park.

The recreational facilities for Lumber River State Park are in a section of Robeson County known as Princess Ann.

Recreation
The Lumber River has 24 boat launches that serve as access points to Lumber River State Park. The entire length of the river is open to fishing. The common game fish are black crappie, largemouth bass, catfish and redbreast sunfish. All anglers must have a valid fishing license and follow the regulations of the North Carolina Wildlife Resources Commission.

Nine primitive camping sites are located at the Princess Ann section of the park. These campsites are meant to be used by no more than six people at a time. Each camp site features a picnic table and grill, lantern holder, trash can, and fire ring. Princess Ann has several hiking trails and picnic areas, and many municipal and county parks are located on the Lumber River as well.

Plants and wildlife
Lumber River State Park provides a habitat for a wide variety of plants and animals. Wildflowers that can be seen at the park include wisteria, sarvis holly, Carolina bogmint, mountain laurel, wild azalea, spider lily and swamp mallow. Trees found in the swamps along the river include bald cypress, water elm, river birch and tulip poplar. Animals and birds in the area include the  American alligator, white-tailed deer, American black bear, beavers, and northern river otters; and barred owls, great blue heron, wild turkey, sandpipers  and prothonotary warblers.

Nearby state parks
The following state parks are within  of Lumber River State Park:
Jones Lake State Park (Bladen County)
Lake Waccamaw State Park (Columbus County)
Little Pee Dee State Park (South Carolina)

References

External links
 

State parks of North Carolina
Protected areas of Columbus County, North Carolina
Protected areas of Moore County, North Carolina
Protected areas of Montgomery County, North Carolina
Protected areas of Robeson County, North Carolina
Protected areas of Scotland County, North Carolina
Protected areas established in 1989